Bobby Wood (born 1992) is an American soccer player.

Bobby Wood may also refer to:
 Bobby Wood (American football) (1916–1973), American football player
 Bobby Wood (footballer) (1892–1928), Scottish footballer
 Bobby Wood (American politician) (1935–2023), American politician

See also
Bob Wood (disambiguation)
Robert Wood (disambiguation)